The Democratic Republican Party(민주공화당) is a conservative political party in South Korea that was founded on September 4, 1997. After it was repeatedly dissolved and re-registered, it was briefly re-registered as the Economic Republican Party just before it participated in the 17th presidential election, in 2007, but in 2008, it returned to its original name, the Democratic Republican Party.

Heo Kyung-young was the party's first president but was replaced on June 22, 2009 by Park Dong-gyu.

2008 establishments in South Korea
Conservative parties in South Korea
Political parties established in 2008